Alex Keating (born October 12, 1987) an American professional poker player from Saratoga, California.

Online poker
Playing under the screen names of "mistakooll" on PokerStars and "kadabra" on Full Tilt Poker, Keating's multitable tournament online winnings exceeded $1,500,000, including a win in the Annual PokerStars 2010 Spring Championship of Online Poker tournament in May for $245,000.

Full Tilt Online Poker Series (FTOPS) 
Under the screen name "Kadabra," Keating won the first event of FTOPS V on August 9, 2007, earning $147,099.

The Poker Stars Spring Championship of Online Poker
On May 10, 2010. playing under the name "mistakooll", Keating won the Spring Championship of Online Poker event #23 High a $1,000 buy in with $1,000 re-buys tournament for $245,000

Sit N Goes
Although Keating has blocked his SharkScope stats on Poker Stars Keating is ranked 13th in Holdem Heads Up over $1000 Average Profit Leaderboard, Ranked 14th in Any Game Over $1000 Average Profit Leaderboard and Ranked 16th in Holdem Heads Up Any Stakes Average Profit Leaderboard  on Full Tilt Poker.

Live poker

The World Series of Poker
Keating made his WSOP debut at the 2009 World Series of Poker with three in the money finishes totaling $48,983 and Keating's best finish being a final table taking 5th place in Event 38 for $39,977.

European Poker Tour
Keating made his first European Poker Tour in the money appearance at the EPT London in the fall of 2009. Keating has had a total of three in-the-money finishes for a total of $17,214.

References

American poker players
1987 births
Living people
People from Saratoga, California